Erica nyassana is a species of plant in the family Ericaceae. It is endemic to Malawi.  It is threatened by habitat loss.

References

nyassana
Flora of Malawi
Vulnerable plants
Endemic flora of Malawi
Taxonomy articles created by Polbot